The 1920 Rhode Island gubernatorial election was held on November 2, 1920. Republican nominee Emery J. San Souci defeated Democratic nominee Edward M. Sullivan with 64.64% of the vote.

General election

Candidates
Major party candidates
Emery J. San Souci, Republican
Edward M. Sullivan, Democratic

Other candidates
Ernest Sherwood, Socialist
Peter McDermott, Socialist Labor

Results

References

1920
Rhode Island
Gubernatorial